Crown Heights is a 2017 American biographical crime drama film written and directed by Matt Ruskin. Adapted from a This American Life podcast, the film tells the true story of Colin Warner who was wrongfully convicted of murder, and how his best friend Carl King devoted his life to proving Colin's innocence. The film stars Lakeith Stanfield as Colin Warner and Nnamdi Asomugha as Carl King.

It premiered in competition at the Sundance Film Festival on January 23, 2017 and won the Audience Award for U.S. Dramatic Film. The film was released on August 18, 2017, by Amazon Studios and IFC Films.

Cast

Production
On August 6, 2015, it was announced that Matt Ruskin would direct a biographical film about wrongfully convicted prisoner Colin Warner based on his own script, which Lila Yacoub would produce along with Black Maple Films and iAm21 Entertainment. Lakeith Stanfield was added to the cast to play Warner who spent 20 years in prison for a crime he did not commit in 1980, when he was just 18 years old. Nnamdi Asomugha would also star as Carl King, Warner's lifelong friend who fought to prove Warner's innocence. On September 15, 2015, newcomer Natalie Paul was cast in the film.

Principal photography on the film began on September 9, 2015 in New York City.

Release
Crown Heights premiered in competition in the US Dramatic Category at the Sundance Film Festival on January 23, 2017. Amazon Studios acquired distribution rights to the film. IFC Films co-distributed the film alongside Amazon on August 18, 2017. The film received generally favorable reviews out of the Sundance Film Festival, winning the Audience Award for U.S. Dramatic Film.

Critical reception 
On Rotten Tomatoes, Crown Heights has an approval rating of 77% based on 84 reviews. The site’s critics consensus states, "Crown Heights' heartbreaking fact-based narrative -- and LaKeith Stanfield's remarkable starring performance -- push this powerful drama past its structural flaws."

Awards and recognition
 Independent Spirit Award for Best Supporting Male - Nnamdi Asomugha (nominee)

References

External links
 
 

2017 biographical drama films
2017 crime drama films
2010s prison drama films
American biographical drama films
American prison drama films
Films about murderers
Films shot in New York City
Films set in Brooklyn
This American Life
2017 independent films
Sundance Film Festival award winners
Works based on podcasts
2010s English-language films
2010s American films
English-language crime drama films